Celcom or Cellcom may refer to:

Celcom, a Malaysian telecommunications company
Cellcom Communications, bell first dealer, a breakaway market leader of the wireless industry in Quebec
Cellcom (Israel), a cellular service provider in Israel
Cellcom (United States), a cellular service provider in Wisconsin, United States